Euromil may refer to: 

 EUROMIL, the European Organisation of Military Associations and Trade Unions
 Euromil Mi-38, a cargo helicopter
 Euromil, the joint helicopter project of Eurocopter and Mil Moscow Helicopter Plant